This is a list of cricketers who played first-class or List A matches for Sukkur cricket team in Pakistan. The team played several seasons in various first-class competitions, primarily the Patron's Trophy, from 1974/75 to 1978/79 and from 1983/84 to 1986/87, and two seasons in the List A President's Trophy, 1984/85 and 1985/86

Abdul Hameed
Abdul Jabbar
Abdul Nabi
Abdul Nabi Magsi
Abid Khan
Abid Raza
Aftab Soomro
Amjad Bhatti
Anwar Zaidi
Aqeel Ahmed
Arif Amin
Arshad Ali
Asad Afridi
Ashfaq Abbasi
Ashiq Hussain
Aslam Baig
Aslam Jafri
Aslam Manghi
Aziz-ur-Rehman
Burhanuddin
Deedar Murtaza
Ghulam Sabir
Hafeez Ahmed
Hanif Baloch
Hasan Kazmi
Hasan Mehdi
Hilal Abbas
Hussain Shah
Imtiaz Ahmed
Irshad Ali
Israr Ahmed
Jarrar Ahmed
Javed Ali
Khaleeq Pirzada
Liaqat Hussain
Manzoor Ahmed
Maqsood Ahmed
Mehdi Pirzada
Mohammad Akram
Mohammad Siddiq
Mohammad Younus
Mohsin Shah
Mubashir Ali
Mumtaz Ali
Mushtaq Butt
Naimatullah
Nasim Ahmed
Nasir Khan
Nayyar Hussain
Nazar Mohammad
Pervez Rehman
Rizwanullah
Rizwan Yousuf
Sadiq Ali
Sajid Mohsin
Samiullah Khan
Sharif Kaka
Siddiq Khan
Tajammul Abbas
Taj Mohammad
Yousuf Bhatti
Zafar Iqbal

References

Sukkur cricketers